Richard Bell is a Canadian film director and screenwriter. He is most noted as the writer and director of the films Eighteen and Brotherhood.

A survival/adventure drama, based on a true story, Brotherhood stars Brendan Fehr, Brendan Fletcher, Jake Manley, Gage Munroe, Dylan Everett, Matthew Isen and Sam Ashe Arnold. It was filmed on the Michipicoten First Nation and at Revival Film Studios in Toronto, Canada. Brotherhood won the Canadian Screen Award for Achievement in Visual Effects.

Eighteen stars Brendan Fletcher, Carly Pope, Mark Hildreth, Thea Gill, and Alan Cumming. The film was narrated by Ian McKellen, with music composed by Bramwell Tovey and performed by the Vancouver Symphony Orchestra. Eighteen was released on DVD on June 27, 2006. It made its Canadian broadcast television premiere on City TV on March 1, 2008 and became available on iTunes in 2010.

Bell adapted Joanne Proulx's novel Anthem of a Reluctant Prophet. The project was developed by Telefilm and Astral Media, through the Harold Greenberg Fund and went to camera on March 27, 2017 with a new shooting script and Bell serving as co-executive producer.

Awards

In 2020, Bell was nominated for a Canadian Screen Award for co-writing the original song "I've Got A Big One" with composer Bramwell Tovey for Brotherhood. He was previously nominated with Tovey in 2007 for a Genie Award for co-writing the song "In a Heartbeat" for his film Eighteen. Vancouver newspaper Xtra West awarded him Visual Artist of the Year for the same film at their annual Hero Awards that year.

References

External links

Living people
Film directors from British Columbia
1975 births
Canadian gay writers
Canadian male screenwriters
Writers from British Columbia
LGBT film directors
Canadian LGBT screenwriters
21st-century Canadian screenwriters
21st-century Canadian male writers
Gay screenwriters
21st-century Canadian LGBT people